Oxyethira is a genus of microcaddisflies in the family Hydroptilidae. There are more than 210 described species in Oxyethira.

See also
 List of Oxyethira species

References

Further reading

External links

 

Hydroptilidae
Articles created by Qbugbot